The Tungkhungia were a sub-branch of the Ahom dynasty.  These kings ruled the Ahom kingdom from 1681 till the end in the beginning of the 19th century.

Genealogy
The genealogy of the Tungkhungia Ahom kings, adapted from Baruah 1993.

|-
|style="text-align: left;"|Notes:

Notes

References

 

Ahom kingdom
18th century in India
19th century in India
1680s establishments in India
1830s disestablishments in India